Jacques Lacarrière (25 July 1906 – 28 July 2005) was a French ice hockey player who competed in the 1928 Winter Olympics and in the 1936 Winter Olympics.

Career 
In 1928, Lacarrière participated with the French team in the Olympic tournament. Eight years later, he was also a member of the French team in the 1936 Olympic tournament. He also established the Français Volants, a French ice hockey team, in 1933.

In 2008, his playing career earned him a selection in the second induction class of the International Ice Hockey Federation Hall of Fame. When his son Philippe was inducted in 2018, the two became the second father-son pairing to be inducted into the IIHF Hall of Fame. Between 2007 and 2017, the Jacques Lacarrière Trophy was awarded to the winner of the Match des Champions. After 2018, it was awarded to the winners of the Ligue Magnus regular season.

References

External links
Olympic ice hockey tournaments 1928 and 1936  

1906 births
2005 deaths
Ice hockey players at the 1928 Winter Olympics
Ice hockey players at the 1936 Winter Olympics
IIHF Hall of Fame inductees
Olympic ice hockey players of France
Ice hockey people from Paris